Abracadabra is a 2006 album recorded by French singer Florent Pagny. It was his tenth studio album and was on April 18, 2006. It achieved huge success in France and Belgium (Wallonia) where it remained charted respectively for 66 and 22 weeks, including a peak at #2. It provided a sole hit single, "Là où je t'emmènerai" (#4 in France, #7 in Belgium, #39 in Switzerland). There is also an edition including a DVD released on November 13, 2006, under Universal Music label.

Track listing
 CD
 "Le Mur" (Daran, Fostinelli, Lebert) — 4:26
 "Je suis" (Cosso, Daran, Fostinelli, Janois, Rousseau) — 3:52
 "Là où je t'emmènerai" (Daran, Vga) — 4:05
 "Comme l'eau se souvient" (Haroche, Manset) — 3:21
 "Désolé" (Cahen, Daran, Fostinelli, Grillet) — 3:02
 "Ça change un homme" (Darren, Miossec) — 3:39
 "Vivons la paix" (Alhister, Daran, Fostinelli, Puccino, Ricour) (duet with Marie-Pascale Giunta) — 4:25
 "J'ai beau vouloir" (Cosso, Daran) — 4:24
 "Abracadabra" (Alhister, Cosso, Ricour) — 2:46
 "Envers et contre moi" (Daran, Fostinelli, Hébrand, Janois, Tarlay) — 5:26
 "À tout peser à bien choisir" (Guirao, Léopold, Soulier) — 5:49

 DVD
Bonuses

Source : Allmusic.

Personnel
 Florent Pagny – vocals
 Fabien Cahen – acoustic guitar
 Philippe Entressangle – percussion, drums
 Erik Fostinelli – percussion, clavier

Production
 René Ameline – engineer
 David Boucher – mixing
 Alexandra Cubizolles – assistant, production executive
 Jean-Paul Gonnod – engineer
 Bertrand Lamblot – artistic director
 Bob Ludwig – mastering

Charts

Certifications and sales

Releases

References

2006 albums
Florent Pagny albums